Veronica, also called Huacrahuilki ("horn pass"), Huacay Huilcay, Wayna Willka, Waqaywillka, Urubamba ("spider's plain"),  or Padre Eterno, is a  mountain in the Urubamba mountain range in the Andes of Peru. It is located in the Cusco Region, La Convención Province, Huayopata District, and in the Urubamba Province, Ollantaytambo District northwest of the town of Ollantaytambo.

See also 

Alfamayo River
Cochapata
Huamanmarca
 Inka Tampu
Lucumayo River
 Urubamba

References

Mountains of Peru
Mountains of Cusco Region